Fleet Feet is an American franchisor of locally owned and operated running stores founded in 1976 in Sacramento, California. The company provides a wide range of running shoes, apparel, and accessories for both men and women. Fleet Feet is known for its knowledgeable and experienced staff, who offer personalized fittings and expert advice to help customers find the right shoes. The company is headquartered in Carrboro, North Carolina.

In addition to its retail locations, Fleet Feet offers training programs, events, and other resources for runners and fitness enthusiasts. The company firmly commits to community involvement and regularly participates in local events and charity initiatives. Fleet Feet operates over 275 stores in the United States and has an online presence.

History
The company was founded in 1976 by Sally Edwards and Elizabeth Jansen, both collegiate athletes, educators, and under 30. Their first store was located on the second floor of a fixer-upper Victorian house in Sacramento, California.

With a focus on community outreach, Edwards and Jansen worked tirelessly to support runners and student-athletes in the Sacramento area. They drove a refurbished United States Postal Service van to area high schools to fit student-athletes and also supported the grassroots events of the area's first running club, the Buffalo Chips. Although sales were slow at first, other brands eventually became vendors, and in 1978, Fleet Feet's second location opened in the town of Chico, 90 miles north of Sacramento.

Rather than becoming a multi-store business, Edwards and Jansen decided to build Fleet Feet as a franchise operation with local ownership. Since its inception, Fleet Feet has been dedicated to inspiring, empowering, and educating runners of all ages, abilities, and backgrounds.

Purchase by Tom Raynor
Fleet Feet underwent a significant change in ownership in 1993 when Tom Raynor purchased the Fleet Feet franchise and two locations from founder Edwards. Raynor began his career in sporting goods as a sales associate with The Athlete’s House in Nashville, Tennessee. He was soon hired by a local sales agency representing multiple vendors, including Nike. His regular reports to Nike, which reflected the changing market and opportunities for the expansion of running, played a significant role in creating a national "tech rep" program called EKIN. The program was the first among footwear manufacturers and attracted young, enthusiastic, and passionate runners, many of whom remain active in the sporting goods industry.

After leaving Nike in 1983, Raynor joined Brooks Shoe Company, where he held various positions before being named Director of Marketing and Product Development. In 1989, Raynor moved to Wilson Sporting Goods, where he was appointed General Manager of Footwear. Raynor returned to running in 1992 when he joined Fleet Feet, where he worked on store operations and new store development.

The following year, Raynor purchased the franchise company and two stores from Edwards, including the original Fleet Feet Sports location in Sacramento. With only two staff in 1993, Fleet Feet expanded to 90 stores in 34 states and the District of Columbia. In 2010, the company's retail sales surpassed $100 million for the first time.

In May 2012, Investors Management Corporation (IMC), a company founded by James Maynard, acquired Fleet Feet from Raynor.

In November 2016, Fleet Feet entered into a partnership with Karhu, becoming the sole retailer of the brand in the United States. Through the collaboration, Fleet Feet and Karhu developed a new running shoe called the Ikoni, created from the data points of over 100,000 customers 3D foot scans.

In June 2018, Fleet Feet unveiled a new logo, which included an iconic mark and removed the word "Sports" from the name. The most notable addition to the logo was the "torch" image placed between "Fleet" and "Feet." The logo's base symbolizes Fleet Feet's inspiration to runners, while the top portion represents the commitment fueled by the brand through its staff, gear, and programs.

In June 2022, Fleet Feet purchased the 11-store Marathon Sports chain], the New Hampshire-based Runner's Alley locations, and the Connecticut soundRunner store locations.

Initiatives
Recent initiatives by Fleet Feet include introducing a 3D foot scanning system fit id, an e-commerce platform at fleetfeet.com, the national training initiative Fleet Feet Running Club, and the nationwide 5K The Big Run events.

Awards and recognition
 Fleet Feet was named Fast Company's 2022 "Brands That Matter" in the retail category.

References

Sporting goods retailers of the United States
Footwear retailers of the United States
Clothing retailers of the United States
Companies based in North Carolina
Retail companies established in 1976
1976 establishments in California